Teliphasa amica is a species of moth of the family Pyralidae. It is found in mainland China (Fujian, Guangxi, Hebei, Henan, Hubei, Jiangxi, Sichuan, Shandong, Tianjin, Yunnan, Zhejiang), Taiwan, Korea and Japan.

The wingspan is 36–40 mm.

References

Moths described in 1879
Epipaschiinae